Daniel Marcel Olbrychski (born 27 February 1945) is a Polish film and theatre actor who is widely considered one of the greatest Polish actors of his generation. He appeared in 180 films and TV productions and is best known for leading roles in several Andrzej Wajda movies including The Promised Land and also known for playing a defector and spymaster Vassily Orlov alongside Hollywood actress Angelina Jolie in the movie Salt.

Life and career 

Olbrychski was born in 1945 in Łowicz, Poland to father Franciszek and mother Klementyna (née Sołonowicz). He had an older brother, Krzysztof (1939–2017), who was a physicist. He attended the Stefan Batory Gymnasium and Lyceum in Warsaw. He has been practicing boxing since his youth, he also trained fencing, badminton and judo.

In 1965, he played the character of Rafał Olbromski, his first major film role in Andrzej Wajda's film The Ashes.

In 1971 he won the award for Best Actor at the 7th Moscow International Film Festival for his role in The Birch Wood.

He played one of the leading roles in Volker Schlöndorff's film The Tin Drum based on Günter Grass's novel Die Blechtrommel. He also appeared in one of the ten short films in Krzysztof Kieślowski's Dekalog and played a role in the film adaptation of The Unbearable Lightness of Being.

In 1986, he played one of the main roles in Margarethe von Trotta's film Rosa Luxemburg. The same year, Olbrychski received the French Legion of Honor (L'Ordre national de la Légion d'honneur).  In 2007 he received the Stanislavsky Award at the 29th Moscow International Film Festival for the outstanding achievement in the career of acting and devotion to the principles of Stanislavsky's school. In 1998, he starred in Nikita Mikhalkov's film the Barber of Siberia. In a 1998 survey published by Polityka magazine he was ranked 7th on the list of the greatest Polish actors of the 20th century.

In 2010, he received a diploma from the National Academy of Dramatic Art in Warsaw. In addition to acting, Olbrychski has been well known for his abilities as an athlete. A keen horse-rider, a boxer and very able with the sabre, Olbrychski personally performed most of the stunt scenes in his movies.

He was selected to be on the jury for the Cinéfondation and short films sections of the 2015 Cannes Film Festival. Throughout his career, he appeared in five Academy Award-nominated films, two of which won the award (The Tin Drum, 1979 and Dangerous Moves, 1984).

Personal life 
In mid-1970s, he was in a relationship with singer Maryla Rodowicz. He has a son Victor from a relationship with German actress Barbara Sukowa. He has been married three times: to actress Monika Dziensiewicz, with whom he has a son Rafał; journalist Zuzanna Łapicka (daughter of Andrzej Łapicki), with whom he has a daughter Weronika, and since 2003 to theatrologist Krystyna Dembska.

He lived for many years in France and speaks French fluently. He practices boxing as a hobby.

During the 2015 Polish presidential election, he endorsed the candidacy of Bronisław Komorowski.  He supports the LGBT community.

Filmography 

1964: Ranny w lesie, as Corporal Koral
1965: The Ashes, as Rafał Olbromski
1966: Potem nastąpi cisza, as Olewicz
1967: Marriage of Convenience, as Andrzej
1967: Bokser, as Tolek Szczepaniak
1967: Jowita, as Marek Arens
1968: The Countess Cosel, as Charles XII
1968: Zaliczenie (TV Short), as Student
1969: Everything for Sale, as Daniel
1969: Colonel Wolodyjowski, as Azja, son of Tugay Bey
1969: The Structure of Crystals, as Himself (uncredited)
1969: Hunting Flies, as Sculptor
1969: Skok
1970: Salt of the Black Earth, as Lt. Stefan Sowinski
1970: Liberation, Film II: Breakthrough, as Genrik
1970: Landscape After the Battle, as Tadeusz
1970: Różaniec z granatów (TV Short), as Józef Laptak
1970: The Birch Wood, as Boleslaw
1970: The Pacifist, as Sergey Abramov (uncredited)
1971: Égi bárány, as A hegedülõ
1971: Family Life, as Ziemowit Braun, called Wit
1971: Osvobozhdenie: Napravlenie glavnogo udara, as Heinrich
1971: Osvobozhdenie: Bitva za Berlin, as Henrik Dombrovski
1972: Pilate and Others (TV Movie), as Matthew Levi
1973: The Wedding, as Bridegroom
1974: Roma rivuole Cesare (TV Movie), as Claudio
1974: The Deluge, as Andrzej Kmicic
1975: The Promised Land, as Karol Borowiecki
1977: Dagny, as Stanislaw Przybyszewski
1977: Trzy po trzy
1977: Zdjecia próbne, as Himself
1979: The Maids of Wilko, as Wiktor Ruben
1979: The Tin Drum, as Jan Bronski
1979: Kung-fu, as Zygmunt
1980: Rycerz, as Herophant
1980: Wizja lokalna 1901, as Priest Paczkowski
1981: Terrarium (TV Movie)
1981: Les Uns et les Autres, as Karl Kremer
1981: The Fall of Italy, as Davorin
1981: From a Far Country, as Captain
1982: The Trout, as Saint-Genis
1982: Roza
1983: La derelitta, as Saül
1983: A Love in Germany, as Wiktorczyk
1983: Si j'avais mille ans
1984: Bis später, ich muss mich erschiessen
1984: Dangerous Moves, as Tac-Tac, l'équipe de Liebskind
1984: Lieber Karl, as Teacher
1985: , as Fritz
1985: Casablanca, Casablanca, as Daniel
1985: Jestem przeciw, as Grzegorz
1985: Flash back, as Vincent Delaune / Thomas
1986: Music Hall (TV Movie), as Paul Bronnen
1986: Rosa Luxemburg, as Leo Jogiches
1986: Ga, ga: Chwała bohaterom, as Hero
1986: Siekierezada, as Michal Katny
1986: Mit meinen heißen Tränen (TV Mini-Series), as Franz von Schober
1986: Mariage blanc (TV Movie), as Félix
1987: Farewell Moscow, as Yuli
1988: The Secret of the Sahara (TV Mini-Series), as Hared
1988: The Unbearable Lightness of Being, as Interior Ministry Official
1988: Zoo, as Martina's Father
1988: To Kill a Priest (uncredited)
1988: La Bottega dell'orefice, as Father Adam
1989: Haute tension (TV Series), as Victor
1989: Dekalog: Three (TV Mini-Series), as Janusz
1989: To teleftaio stoihima, as Orestis
1989: L'Orchestre rouge, as Karl Giering
1989: Passi d'amore
1990: Le Silence d'ailleurs, as François
1991: Coup de foudre (TV Series), as Jan Bergman
1992: A Long Conversation with a Bird (TV Movie), as Angelo
1992: Babochki
1992: Lazos de sangre, as Alberto
1992: Short Breath of Love
1993: Kolejność uczuć, as Rafal Nawrot
1993: Me Ivan, You Abraham, as Stepan
1993: Lepiej być piękną i bogatą, as Lawyer
1993: Dinozavris kvertskhi
1993: Vervonal
1995: Transatlantis, as Neuffer
1995: Pestka, as Borys
1996: A Torvenytelen, as Korlát Gerzson
1996: The Story of Master Twardowski, as Jan Michal Twardowski
1996: Hommes, femmes, mode d'emploi
1996: Poznań '56, as Professor
1996: Truck stop
1997: Dzieci i ryby, as Franciszek
1997: Szökés, as Nagy fõhadnagy, a recski tábor politikai parancsnoka
1997: Balkan Island: The Last Story of the Century, as Limov
1997: Opowieści weekendowe: Ostatni krąg (TV Movie), as Witold
1998: The Barber of Siberia, as Kopnovskiy
1999: With Fire and Sword, as Tugai Bey
1999: Pan Tadeusz, as Gerwazy
2000: To ja, złodziej, as Seweryn
2001: The Spring to Come, as Szymon Gajowiec
2001: The Witcher (2001), as Filavandrel
2002: Gebürtig, as Konrad Sachs
2002: The Revenge, as Dyndalski
2003: An Ancient Tale: When the Sun Was a God, as Piastun
2003: Nitschewo, as Frank
2004: Break Point
2005: The Turkish Gambit, as McLaughlin
2005: The Fall of the Empire (TV Mini-Series), as Strombah
2005: Anthony Zimmer, as Nassaiev
2005: Persona Non Grata, as Polish Deputy Minister of Foreign Affairs
2007: Dwie strony medalu (TV Series), as Toni
2008: Nietzsche v Rossii, as Friedrich Nietzsche
2008: A Man and His Dog, as Taxi polonais
2009: Idealny facet dla mojej dziewczyny, as Dr. Gebauer
2009: Taras Bulba, as Krasnevsky
2009: Mniejsze zlo, as Akowiec
2009: Rewizyta, as Wit
2009-2010: Czas honoru (TV Series), as 'Doctor'
2010: Oda az igazság, as Kinizsi 2.
2010: Nie opuszczaj mnie, as Badecki 'Jupiter'
2010: Salt, as Oleg Vasilievich Orlov
2010: Legenda o Lietajúcom Cypriánovi (uncredited)
2010: Odnoklassniki, as the Pole on the island Goa
2010: Sluby panienskie, as Szlachcic
2011: Wintertochter, as Waldecks Opa
2011: Tolko ne seychas, as Elka's Uncle
2011: Battle of Warsaw 1920, as Józef Piłsudski
2012: Z milosci, as Radwanski
2012: Hans Kloss: Stawka większa niż śmierć, as Werner
2012: The Day of the Siege: September Eleven 1683, as Katski
2012: Sep, as Bozek
2013: The Hardy Bucks Movie, as Roman
2013: Legend No. 17, as NHL manager
2014: Piate: Nie odchodz!, as Homeless
2014: Passenger from San Francisco, as Professor Steinman
2014: Swiadek, as Barak
2016: , as Wladimir Sokulov
2016: Marie Curie: The Courage of Knowledge, as Emile Amagat
2016: Titanium White, as Dean
2017: Stebuklas, as Priest
2018: Studniówk@, as Napoleon
2018: DJ, as Grandpa
2018: Van Goghs, as Victor
2018: Kamerdyner, as Leo von Trettow
2018: Koja je ovo drzava!, as Predsjednik
2018: Souvenir from Odessa, as Mathieu Ozon
2019: Mowa ptaków, as Gustaw
2019: Polityka, as Deputy Stefan

Polish dubbing 
 Cars franchise as Doc Hudson
 Arthur and the Invisibles series as Maltazard
 2006: Heroes of Might and Magic V as Markal
 2008: Fly Me to the Moon as Amos
 2008: Asterix at the Olympic Games as Julius Caesar
 2008: Assassin’s Creed as al-Mualim
 2010: ModNation Racers as Chief
 2011: Red Orchestra 2: Heroes of Stalingrad as Vasily Ivanovich Chuikov

Modern Art 
 2013: The dream Off Penderecki as the Polish lector together with Derek Jacobi, Józef Skrzek, Jaroslaw Pijarowski in the music show by Teatr Tworzenia Theater of Creation edited and published exclusively (limited edition) by Brain Active Records in celebration of the 80th birthday of the great contemporary composer – Krzysztof Penderecki

Awards and distinctions 

The Zbigniew Cybulski Award, (1969), Poland
Golden Cross of Merit, (1974), Poland
Legion of Honour, (1986), France
Ordre des Arts et des Lettres, (1991), France
Commander's Cross of the Order of Polonia Restituta, (1998), Poland
The Actor’s Mission Award at the International Film Festival Art Film in Trenčianske Teplice, (1999), Slovakia
Order of Merit of the Federal Republic of Germany, (2003), Germany
Golden Medal for Merit to Culture – Gloria Artis, (2006), Poland
Medal of Pushkin, (2007), Russia
Krystian Award for Contribution to World Cinema at the Prague International Film Festival – Febiofest, (2007), Czech Republic
Stanislavsky Award at the 29th International Moscow Film Festival, (2007), Russia
Golden Duck Award, (2010), Poland
Best Actor Award for Outstanding Contribution to Cinematography at the 20th The International Film Festival of the Art of Cinematography Camerimage, (2012), Poland
Honorary Degree at the University of Opole, (2013), Poland
Honorary Citizen of the Capital City of Warsaw, (2017), Poland
Golden Unicorn Award for Best Actor, (2019), Russia

See also
Cinema of Poland
List of Polish actors

References

External links 

 
 Daniel Olbrychski at culture.pl

1945 births
Living people
People from Łowicz
21st-century Polish male actors
Polish television actors
Polish male stage actors
Polish film actors
Commanders Crosses of the Order of Merit of the Federal Republic of Germany
Polish male film actors
20th-century Polish male actors
Commanders of the Order of Polonia Restituta
Recipients of the Gold Cross of Merit (Poland)
Recipients of the Gold Medal for Merit to Culture – Gloria Artis
Recipients of the Medal of Pushkin
Chevaliers of the Légion d'honneur
Commandeurs of the Ordre des Arts et des Lettres
Kristián Award winners
Aleksander Zelwerowicz National Academy of Dramatic Art in Warsaw alumni